Environics Research is a fully Canadian-owned company that has been providing consulting and market research services for businesses, governments and not-for-profit organizations for more than 50 years. Environics is a full-service research firm and offers a broad array of research, consulting and communications services. Environics mission is to unlock human insights to help organizations make better decisions, empowering them to act with creativity and confidence.  

The company was founded in 1970; its founding president was Michael Adams and its CEO is Barry Watson.

The company's opinion polls are often cited in Canadian news media.

Environics Group
In addition to Environics Research Group, the Environics group of companies includes Environics Communications, a public affairs and integrated marketing communications consultancy, Nexalogy Environics, a leading-edge social media analysis company, Free For All Marketing, a leading experiential and event marketing firm, and Environics Lipkin, a global research and motivation company.

Environics Communications (currently Proof)

Environics Communications is a Canadian integrated marketing communications firm, established in 1994, by founder and current CEO Bruce MacLellan. The company's services include public relations, brand strategy and planning, creative & video, government relations, influencer marketing, and paid media, among others. In March 2017, the company released the second annual CanTrust Index, which measured Canadians' trust across a wide range of topics, industries, and sectors.

In March 2018, Environics Communications rebranded as Proof Inc.  Proof released the third annual CanTrust Index, continuing the trend of measuring Canadian's trust across topics,

industries, and sectors.

References

Sources
Marijuana industry faces challenge in gaining Canadians’ trust, survey finds
Communicating business decisions is key to building trust
Canadians' trust in banks, institutions, remains steady

External links
 Company website
https://www.getproof.com
https://www.proofexperiences.com/

Public opinion research companies
Market research companies of Canada
Companies based in Toronto
Companies acquired by Bell Canada Enterprises